Solar Sports is a Filipino 24-hour cable TV sports channel, which serves as the flagship channel of Solar Entertainment Corporation, and based in Shaw Boulevard, Mandaluyong, Metro Manila, Philippines. The channel was launched on January 1, 1994, and is available for Sky Cable, Cablelink, G Sat, and contract for local cable operators and via livestreaming.

History
The channel is known for showing sports that are familiar to the Filipinos. Its main programming are the NBA games, which are shown either a game or a doubleheader each day during the season. Other NBA programming includes shows produced by NBA TV, such as the NBA's Greatest Games and WNBA games during the league's off-season. It also shows the American Super Bowl. It is also the Filipino provider of the Olympic Games.

It also shows boxing matches such as the ones from the promotions of Bob Arum, Don King and most recently, Oscar De La Hoya's Golden Boy Promotions. From 2002 to 2006, Solar Sports would cover the fights of Manny Pacquiao, until Pacquiao signed with ABS-CBN for the rights to cover his fights. However, Solar Sports regained the broadcast rights for Pacquiao's fights since 2007 when the channel signed a deal with GMA Network.

Other sports include Volleyball and Badminton, such as the JVC Badminton tournament and the first-ever Manny V. Pangilinan Badminton Tournament, pitting players from Asia and Europe, in 2005.

The network also launched Solar Sports Desk, a late-evening sports news program, similar to ESPN, those  famed American sports programs such as SportsCenter. In October 2006, Solar Sports re-launch its channel, adding local shows.

The channel is available exclusively in Metro Manila through Global Destiny Cable as of 2008. It used to be available exclusively on Sky Cable, but the two parties ceased their partnership at end of 2007 but it will be back on July 1. All cable companies in the provinces can put the channel without having to worry about exclusive rights.

On April 10, 2017 Sky Cable & Destiny Cable dropped Solar Sports along with sister channels Basketball TV (now defunct), CT (now defunct), Jack TV & NBA Premium TV (now defunct) allegedly due to Sky Cable's unpaid carriage fees. On January 1, 2019, the channel was restored on Sky Cable after 1 year of carriage disputes.

On October 1, 2019, Basketball TV ceased airing 13 years after it was first aired in 2006, which means all remaining basketball-related programs will now air on Solar Sports. Among those basketball-related programs include NBL Philippines, Liga Endesa, FIBA World Basketball and Universities and Colleges Basketball League among others.

Programs

Current
Boxing
Bxstrs
KOTV Classics
KOTV Weekly
World Class Boxing (in cooperation with Golden Boy Promotions)
UKC: Ultimate Knockout Challenge
World Series of Fighting (Mixed Martial Arts)
Motoring
Auto Focus
Auto Speed
Motoring Today
Mobil 1 The Grid
Arctic Race of Norway
Le Mans Classic
Rallye des Princesses
Abu Dhabi Desert Challenge
Volta Ciclista a Catalunya
Billiards
Cue Masters
UCI World Tour
Next Stop
eGG Network (eSports)
Marathon de Paris
World of Free Sports
J1 League
Other
Homecourt
Board Stories

Local programs
 All-Out Action (Tagalog Action Movie Block)
 Action After Dark (Tagalog Late Night Movie Block)
 EZ Shop
 Filipino Basketball League (Filbasket)
 National Basketball League (Philippines)
 Women's National Basketball League (Philippines) 
 National Basketball League-Youth
 Pilipinas VisMin Super Cup Basketball
  Pilipinas Super League
 Philippine Secondary Schools Basketball Championship
 Shakey's Super League (also broadcast on IBC)
 UGB MMA (Underground Battle MMA) 
 Universal Reality Combat Championship

Former
ATP Tour
WTA Tour
Davis Cup
Fed Cup
World of Tennis
FLW Outdoor Tour Bass
IDSF: Best of Dance Sports
Greatest Classics
Boxing at the Bay
Saved by the Bell
Fight Night Max
Ringside
Champions Tour
A Round of Golf
The Haney Project
Trump's Fabulous World of Golf
NBA on Solar Sports
Philippine Basketball League (2002–2003)
Undisputed
WNCAA
Hoop Nation
In The Zone
Auto Extreme
Search TV
ECW on Sci Fi
UFC 
German Bundesliga
LFP
NFL 
Gameplan
Celebrity Poker
The Ultimate Fighter
NASCAR 
Billiards Pinoy
Ferrari World
U.S. Open
French Open
Golf Today
Human Wrecking Balls
Philippine Super Liga
Poker Heaven
Raceworld
World Game
Global Football
Premier Darts
K-1
Smashing Action
La Liga 
Elite XC
Liga Pilipinas
Sports Insider
Home Shopping Network
Sports Desk
PGA Tour
Jai-Alai Games
National Capital Region Athletic Association
X-Play
Versus
Pancrase
Sports Jobs with Junior Seau
World Strongman Super Series
2 Months 2 Million
Champions League Basketball 3x3 (Australia)
Move (Digital Series)
Wednesday Warriors (Mixed Martial Arts)
Friday Fight Fest
Basketball
FIBA World Basketball
Liga Endesa
The Fifth Quarter
 Sagupaan (now on One Sports)
 San Juan Coliseum Derby Time
Golf
Ladies European Tour
Fight Zone
Glory Kickboxing
Mobil 1 The Grid
OZ Style
Perspectives (Sports Documentaries)
The Biggest Loser
Survivor
World Baseball Classic
World Wide Sports
World of Athletics
World of Badminton
Other
Broken Skull
Exterra Adventure
Game Changers
Nomads
Car Matchmaker
Shifting Gears
Trans World Sport
BWF Super Series
The Fighters
Mosconi Cup
World Cup of Pool
World Pool Masters
Movie Timeout (Hollywood Movie Block)
 Shop TV
 Business & Leisure
 Philippine Collegiate Champions League
 Universities and Colleges Basketball League

Sports coverages
AVC Asian Women's Cup
Copa Libertadores
Fit To Hit: Philippine Beach Volleyball Invitational
Shakey's Girls Volleyball League (Rebisco Volleyball League)
2005 Manila SEA Games Coverage
2006 Asian Games
2008 Beijing Olympic Games Coverage
2010 Vancouver Olympic Games Coverage
2010 Singapore Youth Olympic Games Coverage
2012 London Olympic Games Coverage

See also 
Solar Entertainment Corporation
Basketball TV (defunct channel)
NBA Premium TV (defunct channel)
S+A (defunct channel)
5 Plus (now One Sports)
Balls (defunct channel)
Liga (defunct channel)
NBA TV Philippines
One Sports+
PBA Rush
TAP Sports
Premier Sports

External links

References

Solar Entertainment Corporation channels
Sports television networks in the Philippines
English-language television stations in the Philippines
Television channels and stations established in 1994
Sports television in the Philippines
Television networks in the Philippines
1994 establishments in the Philippines